Isaac Douglas Jones (born December 7, 1975) is a former American football wide receiver in the National Football League. He was signed Indianapolis Colts as an Undrafted free agent in 1999. He played college football at Purdue.

Isaac was selected to lead "Shout" during the Missouri vs. Purdue game on September 15, 2018.

References

1975 births
Living people
Sportspeople from Little Rock, Arkansas
Players of American football from Arkansas
American football wide receivers
Purdue Boilermakers football players
Indianapolis Colts players